Sunview may refer to: 

Sunview, Indiana
Oaklawn-Sunview, Kansas
SunView, the windowing system of SunOS